Marinette Pichon (born 26 November 1975) is a French former football player.

Biography
Pichon had a dysfunctional childhood with an alcoholic father.

Career
She started her career at Saint-Memmie Olympique, then signed on to the Women's United Soccer Association (WUSA), the American professional league. She played for the Philadelphia Charge during their 2002 and 2003 seasons, in 2002 ranking second in the league in goals scored and winning the Most Valuable Player and Offensive Player of the Year awards. In 2003, she tied for the lead in goals scored and led the league in goals per game.

After the WUSA disbanded in 2003, she returned to France, where she played for Juvisy FCF. She was the leading domestic scorer in the 2000/01, 2001/02, 2004/05, and 2005/06 seasons. She also played  for the New Jersey Wildcats in the American W-League during their 2004 season, leading the league that year in both goals scored and total points despite playing in only ten matches.

International career
She appeared for France from 1994 until 2006, announcing her retirement at the age of 31 following France's elimination from World Cup qualifying. During her career, she scored 81 goals in 112 international matches. She played for France at the 2003 FIFA Women's World Cup.

Personal life
In November 2012, a change in law gave Pichon the distinction of being the second woman in France to be granted "paternity" leave. Her wife gave birth to their son following in vitro fertilisation (IVF). Pichon received a Legion of Honour.

Popular culture
Garance Marillier is expected to portray Marinette Pichon in a movie adaptation of her life.

References

External links
Profile at Footofeminin.fr
Profile at WUSA
 
 

1975 births
Living people
French women's footballers
Women's United Soccer Association players
Philadelphia Charge players
Paris FC (women) players
FIFA Century Club
France women's international footballers
2003 FIFA Women's World Cup players
People from Bar-sur-Aube
Lesbian sportswomen
LGBT association football players
French LGBT sportspeople
Women's association football forwards
Division 1 Féminine players
Sportspeople from Aube
Footballers from Grand Est
Recipients of the Legion of Honour
French expatriate sportspeople in the United States
French expatriate women's footballers
Expatriate women's soccer players in the United States